Calders Geo is an inlet in the western cliffs of Esha Ness in Northmavine on the Mainland, Shetland, Scotland. A cave on the north side of the geo has been measured at more than one and a half times the size of "The Frozen Deep", a chamber in Reservoir Hole under Cheddar Gorge in Somerset, potentially making it the largest natural chamber in Britain.

Geologist Jonathan Swale used a laser range-finder to measure the interior of the cave, which is only accessible during calm seas.

Esha Ness Lighthouse just south of the geo was designed by David Alan Stevenson and commissioned in 1929.

References

Caves of Scotland
Sea caves
Landforms of Shetland
Northmavine